Čabrače is a small dispersed settlement in the Municipality of Gorenja Vas–Poljane in the Upper Carniola region of Slovenia.

Name
Čabrače was attested in historical sources as Schabratssch in 1291, Schabratsch in 1420, and Tschbratzi in 1500. The name comes from the plural demonym *Ča(je)braťane based on the personal name *Ča(je)bratъ, thus meaning 'residents of Ča(je)bratъ's village'.

Church

The local church is dedicated to Saint Gertrude. An older Gothic structure was remodeled in the early 18th century, when the belfry was also added.

References

External links 

Čabrače on Geopedia

Populated places in the Municipality of Gorenja vas-Poljane